Nora Marlowe (September 5, 1915 – December 31, 1977) was an American film and television character actress.

Born in Worcester, Massachusetts, Marlowe was an actress best known for her role from 1973 to 1977 as boardinghouse owner/operator Flossie Brimmer in 27 episodes of the drama The Waltons.

Marlowe also played Sara Andrews in 23 episodes of the sitcom The Governor and J.J., starring Dan Dailey, and she was cast in films such as The Thomas Crown Affair, North by Northwest (as Anna, the housekeeper who holds Roger O. Thornhill at gunpoint), and Westworld.

Career
Marlowe was cast in the 1959-1960 television season as Martha Commager, the owner of a boarding house, in seven episodes of Law of the Plainsman. She appeared three times as Mrs. Moffatt on the sitcom My Living Doll, starring Robert Cummings and Julie Newmar.

She appeared twice on the series State Trooper as Julia Brundidge in "Meeting at Julias" (1956) and as Sarah Brinkman  in "The Clever Man" (1958). She then appeared in 1960 in Cameron's other crime drama series Coronado 9 as Nora Morgan in the episode "Run Scared."

Marlowe appeared seven times on Wagon Train, six times on Gunsmoke (one episode of which, “Robin Hood”, she co-starred with her husband, actor James McCallion), and twice on Dick Powell's Zane Grey Theater. Her other guest-starring roles included Schlitz Playhouse, 77 Sunset Strip, Hawaiian Eye, The Millionaire, Shotgun Slade, Hotel de Paree, General Electric Theater, 87th Precinct, Frontier Circus, The Alfred Hitchcock Hour, The Donna Reed Show, Petticoat Junction, Going My Way, Twelve O'Clock High, Family Affair, “Bewitched”,The Green Hornet, Lassie, Bridget Loves Bernie, Here Come the Brides, Barnaby Jones, Medical Center, Cade's County, Cannon, The Rockford Files, The Big Valley, The Guns of Will Sonnett, The F.B.I., Marcus Welby, M.D.,  The Outer Limits, The Bob Newhart Show, The Streets of San Francisco, and most notably her two appearances on The Twilight Zone: the 1961 episode "Back There" and the 1964 episode "Night Call".

On The Waltons, she played Mrs. Flossie Brimmer, a widow who ran the boardinghouse.  Like Will Geer, who played grandfather Zebulon Walton, Marlowe died between the end of the 6th season, and the start of filming for the 7th season.  Also, like Will Geer, the role was not recast, and the first episode of the 7th season made reference of her death.  As it is mentioned that it has been 6 months since Zebulon Walton died, Flossie died somewhere in that timespan, in 1941.    Viewers were made aware of her death by a scene in Ike Godsey's store.  Olivia Walton receives a package from Patsy Brimmer, Flossie's niece.  The package contains Flossie's cameo ring, and a note from Patsy stating that she felt Flossie would have wanted Olivia to have it, and a request to think of Flossie when it was worn.  The Baldwin sisters, Miss Emily and Miss Mamie, Corabeth Godsey, Ike Godsey, and Olivia then reminisce about Flossie, and Miss Emily comments that the boardinghouse is now boarded up.  Later in the episode, it is revealed that one of the borders, Zulilia, known for flirting in past episodes with Zebulon Walton, purchased it, with plans to reopen it.

Personal life
She was married to actor James McCallion for 34 years from 1943 until her death in 1977. Her husband was a National Velvet series regular, cast as the ex-jockey Mi Taylor. In addition to National Velvet, she and McCallion appeared together in Wagon Train and The Big Valley. They had two children, Denis McCallion and Tracey McCallion Campbell. Their son, Denis McCallion, became a television producer and daughter Tracey worked as a personal assistant to many people in the entertainment industry

Marlowe died in Los Angeles, California, on December 31, 1977.

Filmography

 I'll Cry Tomorrow (1957) - Nurse (uncredited)
 The Shadow on the Window (1957) - Mrs. Bergen (uncredited)
 This Could Be the Night (1957) - Mrs. Gretchma (uncredited)
 Designing Woman (1957) - Jennifer Deane (uncredited)
 An Affair to Remember (1957) - Gladys - Terry's Maid (uncredited)
 Handle with Care (1958) - Mrs. Franklin (uncredited)
 The Rabbit Trap (1959) - Bus Passenger (uncredited)
 North by Northwest (1959) - Anna - Housekeeper (uncredited)
 The Brass Bottle (1964) - Mrs. McGruder
 Kitten with a Whip (1964) - Matron
 Strange Bedfellows (1965) - Mrs. Carmody, Toni's Maid (uncredited)
 That Funny Feeling (1965) - Woman at Phone Booth
 Texas Across the River (1966) - Emma
 Eight on the Lam (1967) - Arthur's Wife (uncredited)
 The Hostage (1967) - Selma Morton
 Where Were You When the Lights Went Out? (1968) - Autograph Seeker (uncredited)
 The Thomas Crown Affair (1968) - Marcie
 Bewitched (1969) - Mrs. Harper
 Gaily, Gaily (1969) - (uncredited)
 Thirty Dangerous Seconds (1972)
 Soylent Green (1973) - Soylent Crumbs Seller (uncredited)
 Westworld (1973) - Hostess
 Mr. Ricco (1975) - Mrs. Callahan

References

External links
 

1915 births
1977 deaths
Actresses from Worcester, Massachusetts
American television actresses
American film actresses
Actresses from Los Angeles
20th-century American actresses